John McEnroe was the defending champion and won in the final 6–4, 6–1, 6–4 against Gene Mayer.

Seeds

  Jimmy Connors (semifinals)
  John McEnroe (champion)
  Vitas Gerulaitis (first round)
  Gene Mayer (final)
  Peter McNamara (quarterfinals)
  Eliot Teltscher (quarterfinals)
  Steve Denton (semifinals)
  Mark Edmondson (second round)

Draw

Finals

Section 1

Section 2

External links
 1982 Custom Credit Australian Indoor Championships draw

Singles